Cowiea borneensis is a plant in the Rubiaceae family, native to north east Borneo.

Description 
It is a climbing shrub, having very long slender, spiked inflorescences with very small pentamerous flowers with  short thick club-shaped (clavate) styles. The leathery elliptic leaves (16 cm by  5 cm) are on stems (5-8 mm). The scarcely joined stipules are 1.3 cm long and about 5 mm at the base. The calyx is 1 mm long. The corolla is sparsely hairy outside, but inside, the throat is densely bearded, but otherwise without hairs. The style together with the stigma is about 1.5 mm long. The berries are about 8 mm long by 4 mm in diameter.

Habitat

Taxonomy 
It was first described in 1914 by Herbert Fuller Wernham, and is the type species of the genus, (named thus to honour William Clark Cowie, a chairman of the North Borneo Company), with the species epithet, borneensis, describing the plant as coming from Borneo.

An isotype, NY00131190, collected by A.D.E. Elmer in Sabah is held at the William and Lynda Steere Herbarium.

References

External links
Cowiea borneensis images and occurrence data map from GBIF

Taxa named by Herbert Fuller Wernham
Octotropideae
Plants described in 1914